"Rogue state" (or sometimes "outlaw state") is a term applied by some international theorists to states that they consider threatening to the world's peace. These states meet certain criteria, such as being ruled by authoritarian or totalitarian governments that severely restrict human rights, sponsoring terrorism, or seeking to proliferate weapons of mass destruction. The term is used most by the United States (although the US State Department officially stopped using the term in 2000); in his speech at the United Nations (UN) in 2017, U.S. President Donald Trump reiterated this phrase. However, it has been applied by other countries as well.

History of the term 
As early as July 1985, President Ronald Reagan stated that "we are not going to tolerate … attacks from outlaw states by the strangest collection of misfits, looney tunes, and squalid criminals since the advent of the Third Reich," but it fell to the Clinton administration to elaborate on this concept. In the 1994 issue of Foreign Affairs, U.S. National Security Advisor Anthony Lake labelled five nations as rogue states: North Korea, Cuba, Iran, Libya under Muammar Gaddafi, and Iraq under Saddam Hussein. He described these regimes as "recalcitrant and outlaw states that not only choose to remain outside the family [of democratic nations] but also assault its basic values". In theory, to be classified as a rogue state, a state had to seek to obtain weapons of mass destruction, support terrorism, and severely abuse its own citizens. While four of the listed countries met all these conditions, Cuba, though known for repressing its citizens and its vocal criticism of the United States, was put on the list solely because of the political influence of the Cuban-American community and specifically that of the Cuban American National Foundation (pre-Jorge Mas Santos), whereas Syria and Pakistan avoided being added to the list because the United States hoped that Damascus could play a constructive role in the Arab-Israeli peace process, and because Washington had long maintained close relations with Islamabad—a vestige of the Cold War.

Three other nations, the Federal Republic of Yugoslavia, Sudan, and the Islamic Emirate of Afghanistan, were treated as rogue states as well. The US State Department at times labelled Yugoslavia as a "rogue state" because its leader, Slobodan Milošević, had been accused of violating the rights of his nation's citizens, including but not limited to attempted genocide in Croatia and orchestrating the Srebrenica massacre in eastern Bosnia.

The United States employed several tools to isolate and punish "rogue states". Tough unilateral economic sanctions, often at congressional behest, were imposed on or tightened against Iran, Libya, Cuba, Sudan, and Afghanistan. After the conclusion of the Gulf War in 1991, the United States selectively used airpower against Iraq for years during the Iraqi no-fly zones to force them in complying with various United Nations Security Council resolutions regarding disarmament (i.e., Resolution 687) and human rights (i.e., Resolution 688). Cruise missiles were fired at Afghanistan and Sudan in retaliation for terrorist attacks against U.S. embassies in Kenya and Tanzania in August 1998. In March 1999, NATO launched a massive air-bombing campaign against Yugoslavia in response to the Yugoslav Army's crackdown on ethnic Albanian separatists in the province of Kosovo.

In the last six months of the Clinton administration, U.S. Secretary of State Madeleine Albright announced that the term rogue state would be abolished in June 2000, in favour of the term states of concern, as three of the nations listed as "rogue states" (Libya, Iran, and North Korea) no longer met the conditions established to define a rogue state.

Libya was removed from the State Sponsors of Terrorism list in 2006 after achieving success through diplomacy. Relations with Libya also became more mutual following the eight month Libyan Civil War in 2011, which resulted in the National Transitional Council ousting longtime Libyan leader Muammar Gaddafi from power.

In 2015, after the US reopened its embassy in Cuba and restarted diplomatic relations with the Cuban government, Cuba was removed from the list of State sponsors of terrorism and was no longer referred to as a "rogue state".

More recently, the administration of U.S. President Donald Trump labelled Venezuela a "rogue state" due to its gross human rights violations, economic collapse and rampant excess deaths, anti-American stances and its reported involvement in international drug trafficking. During the 2017 UN general assembly, UN ambassador Nikki Haley called Venezuela a global threat and a "dangerous narco-state". Some figures of the Venezuelan government, like Vice President Tareck el Aissami and Minister of Defense Vladimir Padrino López, were permanently banned from entering US territory, due to their involvement with human rights abuses and drug cartels. Later in 2017, the US government banned all high ranking Venezuelan government officials from entering US territory. Currently, due to the 2019 Venezuelan presidential crisis, Nicolas Maduro's government (which controls Venezuela de facto) is not recognized as legitimate by the United States or any other state in the Western Hemisphere, with the exceptions of Cuba, Dominica, Nicaragua, Saint Kitts and Nevis, Saint Vincent and the Grenadines, and Suriname.

On June 19, 2020, U.S. Secretary of State Mike Pompeo called the People's Republic of China a "rogue actor" at the Virtual Copenhagen Democracy Summit, saying that "General Secretary Xi Jinping has green-lighted a brutal campaign of repression against Chinese Muslims, a human rights violation on a scale we haven’t seen since World War II." In addition, Pompeo cited China's handling of COVID-19, "malicious cyber campaigns" it conducted, and its treatment of Hong Kong citizens as reasons for labeling China as a rogue actor.

Later terms 
In the aftermath of the September 11 attacks, the Bush administration returned to using a similar term. The concept of rogue states was replaced by the Bush administration with the concept of an Axis of Evil, which encompassed Iraq, Iran, and North Korea. U.S. President George W. Bush first spoke of this "Axis of Evil" during his January 2002 State of the Union Address. More terms, such as Outposts of Tyranny, would follow suit.

Because the U.S. government remains the most active proponent of the expression rogue state, the term has received much criticism from those who disagree with American foreign policy. Both the concepts of rogue states and the Axis of Evil have been criticized by scholars, including philosopher Jacques Derrida and linguist Noam Chomsky, who considered it more or less a justification of imperialism and a useful word for propaganda. Some critics charge that rogue state merely means any state that is generally hostile to the U.S., or even one that opposes the U.S. without necessarily posing a wider threat. Others, such as author William Blum, argued that the term is also applicable to the U.S. and Israel. In his Rogue State: A Guide to the World's Only Superpower, Blum claimed that the United States defines itself as a rogue state through its foreign policy.

Usage by Turkey 
On 23 February 1999, Turkish President Süleyman Demirel described Greece as a "rogue state" because of its alleged support of the Kurdistan Workers' Party (PKK). Demirel said that "Greece serves as a sanctuary for members of the PKK seeking shelter and provides training facilities and logistics to the terrorists."

On June 28, 2012, after the shooting down of a Turkish warplane by the Syrian Army during the Syrian civil war, Turkish Prime Minister Recep Tayyip Erdoğan declared Syria to be a "rogue state".
In October 2020, Turkish President Erdoğan described Armenia as a rogue state, referring to the 2020 Nagorno-Karabakh war. He used the words "countries supporting rogue state Armenia in its occupation of Karabakh would have to face the common conscience of humanity" in his statements. Commentator Robert Ellis, writing in the  British newspaper The Independent in 2016, claimed that Turkey under President Recep Tayyip Erdogan risks "being regarded as a rogue state" due to its increasingly authoritarian government, the deterioration of the human rights in the country, the Turkish government's involvement in Syria and its alleged support of terrorist groups.

Similarly, Erdoğan made the following statements at the press conference he held after the cabinet meeting on October 5, 2020: "It is not possible for humanity to attain permanent peace and tranquility without saving the world from rogue states and their rogue rulers. Especially in our region, the number of rogue states is quite high. These rogue states, dating back to Israel, Greek Administration of Cyprus and the Syrian regime, persecute their own citizens and destabilize the world."

United States as a rogue state 
Some critics of US foreign policy describe the United States as a rogue state. William Blum's 2000 book Rogue State: A Guide to the World's Only Superpower suggests that US-led interventions around the world during and after the Cold War have threatened the world's peace. Noam Chomsky has also described the US as a rogue state after the assassination of Qasem Suleimani. Its nuclear proliferation and large numbers of nuclear warheads (the second most in the world), sponsorship of terrorist or guerilla groups to overthrow opposing governments especially in Latin America, and violations of human rights in war time are all suggested to be characteristics of a rogue state.

See also 
 Axis of evil
 Failed state
 Rump state
 International isolation
 Pariah state
 State Sponsors of Terrorism
 Troika of tyranny

References

Further reading 
 Blum, William. (2006). Rogue state: a guide to the world's only superpower. Zed Books. .
 Chomsky, Noam. (2000). Rogue States: The Rule of Force in World Affairs. Pluto Press. .
 Derrida, Jacques. (2005). Rogues: Two Essays on Reason. Stanford University Press. . Translated by Pascale-Anne Brault and Michael Naas.
 Litwak, Robert. (2000). Rogue states and U.S. foreign policy: containment after the Cold War. Woodrow Wilson Center Press. .

External links 
 Prevent Our Enemies from Threatening Us, Our Allies, and Our Friends with Weapons of Mass Destruction - Official White House statement
 The New America Foundation: Beyond American Hegemony

International security
Political neologisms
Types of countries
Political theories
1980s neologisms